Franco Roncadelli (born 6 February 2000) is a Uruguayan tennis player.

Roncadelli has a career high ATP singles ranking of 1657 achieved on 3 December 2018. He also has a career high ATP doubles ranking of 2215 achieved on 6 January 2020.

Roncadelli made his ATP main draw debut at the 2020 ATP Cup, losing a singles match to Roberto Bautista Agut.

ATP Challenger and ITF Futures finals

Singles: 1 (0–1)

Doubles 2 (1–1)

References

External links

2000 births
Living people
Uruguayan male tennis players
Sportspeople from Montevideo
Tennis players at the 2019 Pan American Games
Pan American Games competitors for Uruguay